Kiran George (born 11 February 2000) is an Indian badminton player who trains at the Prakash Padukone Badminton Academy. He won the Polish International title. He also competed in the 2020 Thomas Cup and  2022 Badminton Asia Team Championships.

Career

2021–22
In 2021, Kiran George's first tournament played was the Orléans Masters where lost to Brice Leverdez in the 3rd round. In September, Kiran played in the Polish International where he won the tournament beating Jason Teh in the finals winning his first ever tournament since the Ghana International in 2019. He also reached the semis of the Welsh International but lost to Siril Verma.

In 2022, Kiran started the year by playing in 3 BWF world tour tournaments including the India Open Which he lost the first round and the Syed Modi International which he also lost the first round and the Odisha Open which he won the title beating Priyanshu Rajawat to win his first ever BWF World Tour title. He competed at the  2022 Badminton Asia Team Championships but was eliminated at the group stage. First he lost to Korean Kim Joo-wan by the score of 18-21 and 14-21 then he lost to Hong Kong's Chan Yin Chak in the score of 13-21,21-17 and 9-21 and finally Ikhsan Rumbay in the score of 13-21, 21-17 and 10-21.

Achievements

BWF World Tour (1 title) 
The BWF World Tour, which was announced on 19 March 2017 and implemented in 2018, is a series of elite badminton tournaments sanctioned by the Badminton World Federation (BWF). The BWF World Tour is divided into levels of World Tour Finals, Super 1000, Super 750, Super 500, Super 300 (part of the HSBC World Tour), and the BWF Tour Super 100.

Men's singles

BWF International (3 titles, 1 runner-up) 
Men's singles

  BWF International Challenge tournament
  BWF International Series tournament

Performance timeline

National team 
 Junior level

 Senior level

Individual competitions 
 Junior level

 Senior level

References

External links 
 

2000 births
Living people
Sportspeople from Kochi
Racket sportspeople from Kerala
Indian male badminton players